Ames Hellicar (2 March 1847 – 27 December 1907) was a New Zealand cricketer. He played one first-class match for Otago in 1872/73.

Ames Hellicar was born in Bristol, England, and emigrated with his family to Australia when he was seven. After attending Melbourne Church of England Grammar School, he joined the Bank of Australasia, and worked for the bank in various posts in Australia and New Zealand before being appointed manager of the Sydney branch in 1887. In 1905 he was appointed the bank's superintendent, working in its Melbourne headquarters. However, illness soon forced him to retire, and he died in December 1907 at his home in St Kilda.

See also
 List of Otago representative cricketers

References

External links
 

1847 births
1907 deaths
People educated at Melbourne Grammar School
New Zealand cricketers
Otago cricketers
Cricketers from Bristol
Australian bankers
19th-century Australian businesspeople